Mnium is a genus of mosses belonging to the family Mniaceae. The species of this genus are found in Europe and North America.

Species
The following species are recognised in the genus Mnium:
 Mnium arizonicum J.J. Amann – Arizona calcareous moss	 
 Mnium blyttii Bruch & Schimp. – Blytt's calcareous moss	 
 Mnium hornum Hedw. – horn calcareous moss	 
 Mnium jungermannia L.
 Mnium lycopodioides Schwägr. 	 
 Mnium marginatum (Dicks. ex With.) P. Beauv. – olivegreen calcareous moss	 
 Mnium spinosum (Voit) Schwägr. – spinosum calcareous moss	 
 Mnium spinulosum Bruch & Schimp. – largetooth calcareous moss	 
 Mnium stellare Hedw. – stellar calcareous moss	 
 Mnium thomsonii Schimp. – Thomson's calcareous moss

References

Mniaceae
Moss genera
Taxa named by Johann Hedwig